Aliabad-e Salar (also Romanized as ‘Alīābād-e Sālār; also known as ‘Alīābād) is a village in Khobriz Rural District, in the Central District of Arsanjan County, Fars Province, Iran. At the 2006 census, its population was 527, in 120 families.

References 

Populated places in Arsanjan County